Turbo histrio is a species of sea snail, a marine gastropod mollusk in the family Turbinidae, the turban snails.

Description
The height of the shell attains 45 mm, its diameter 40 mm. The shell is somewhat globose, swollen, and imperforated. The sutures of the spire are excavately channelled and spirally ridged. These ridges are very finely laminiferous and squamate. The scales are strong and erect. The color of the shell is snowy-white, broadly rayed with orange-rust color. The interior is silvered.

Distribution
This marine species was found in the Indian Ocean off the Amirante Islands

Notes
Additional information regarding this species:
 Taxonomic status: Some authors place the name in the subgenus Turbo (Marmarostoma).

References

External links
 To Encyclopedia of Life
 To World Register of Marine Species

histrio
Gastropods described in 1848